The African Civil Aviation Commission (AFCAC; , CAFAC) is an agency of the African Union headquartered in Dakar. Its purpose is to develop and regulate civil aviation in Africa.

AFCAC was founded as a specialised agency of the Organisation of African Unity on 17 January 1969. The Yamoussoukro Decision was written in 1999 and became binding in 2002. AFCAC is now the executing agency of the Single African Air Transport Market, which implements the Yamoussoukro Decision. Its cooperation with the International Civil Aviation Organization includes promoting the application of ICAO's Standards and Recommended Practices.

The agency receives administrative and financial assistance from ICAO and has also gotten funding from the African Development Bank.  many states did not pay their membership dues and 90 % of AFCAC's income was spent on salaries and administrative costs.

References

External links 
 
 African Civil Aviation Commission Constitution (AFCAC)
 Revised Constitution of the African Civil Aviation Commission

Civil aviation authorities in Africa
African Union